John Joseph Gotti Jr. (October 27, 1940 – June 10, 2002) was an American gangster and boss of the Gambino crime family in New York City. He ordered and helped to orchestrate the murder of Gambino boss Paul Castellano in December 1985 and took over the family shortly thereafter, becoming boss of what was described as America's most powerful crime syndicate.

Gotti and his brothers grew up in poverty and turned to a life of crime at an early age. Gotti quickly became one of the crime family's biggest earners and a protégé of Aniello Dellacroce, the Gambino family underboss, operating out of the neighborhood of Ozone Park in Queens. Following the FBI's indictment of members of Gotti's crew for selling narcotics, Gotti began to fear that he and his brother would be killed by Castellano for dealing drugs. As this fear continued to grow, and amidst growing dissent over the leadership of the crime family, Gotti organized the murder of Castellano.

At his peak, Gotti was one of the most powerful and dangerous crime bosses in the United States. During his era, he became widely known for his outspoken personality and flamboyant style, which gained him favor with some of the general public. While his peers generally avoided attracting attention, especially from the media, Gotti became known as "The Dapper Don", for his expensive clothes and personality in front of news cameras. He was later given the nickname "The Teflon Don" after three high-profile trials in the 1980s resulted in his acquittal, though it was later revealed that the trials had been tainted by jury tampering, juror misconduct and witness intimidation. Law enforcement authorities continued gathering evidence against Gotti, who reportedly earned between $5–20 million per year as Gambino boss.

Gotti's underboss, Salvatore "Sammy the Bull" Gravano, aided the FBI in convicting Gotti; in 1991, Gravano agreed to turn state's evidence and testify against Gotti after hearing the boss make disparaging remarks about him on a wiretap that implicated them both in several murders. In 1992, Gotti was convicted of five murders, conspiracy to commit murder, racketeering, obstruction of justice, tax evasion, illegal gambling, extortion, and loansharking. He received life in prison without parole and was transferred to United States Penitentiary, Marion. Gotti died of throat cancer on June 10, 2002, at the United States Medical Center for Federal Prisoners in Springfield, Missouri. According to Anthony "Gaspipe" Casso, the former underboss of the Lucchese crime family, "what John Gotti did was the beginning of the end of Cosa Nostra".

Early life 
Gotti was born in the Bronx borough of New York City, on October 27, 1940. He was the fifth of the 13 children (two had died at birth) of John Joseph Gotti Sr. and Philomena "Fannie" DeCarlo. His parents were born in New York City, but it is presumed that his grandparents were from San Giuseppe Vesuviano, in the province of Naples, Italy, because his parents were married and lived there for some time. Gotti was one of five brothers who became made men in the Gambino crime family: Eugene "Gene" Gotti was initiated before John due to the latter's incarceration, Peter Gotti was initiated under John's leadership in 1988, and Richard V. Gotti was identified as a caporegime (made member who heads a "crew" of soldiers and has major social status) by 2002. The fifth, Vincent, was initiated in 2002.

By the age of 12, the Gottis settled in East New York, Brooklyn, where he grew up in poverty alongside his brothers. His father worked irregularly as a day laborer. As an adult, Gotti came to resent his father for being unable to provide for his family. In school, he had a history of truancy and bullying other students, and ultimately dropped out of Franklin K. Lane High School at the age of 16.

Gotti was involved in street gangs associated with New York City mafiosi from the age of 12. When he was 14, he was attempting to steal a cement mixer from a construction site when it fell, crushing his toes; this injury left him with a permanent limp. After leaving school, he devoted himself to working with the Mafia-associated Fulton-Rockaway Boys gang, where he met and befriended fellow future Gambino mobsters Angelo Ruggiero and Wilfred "Willie Boy" Johnson.

Gotti met his future wife, Victoria DiGiorgio, who was of half-Italian and half-Russian descent, at a bar in 1958. The couple were married on March 6, 1962. According to FBI documents, DiGiorgio was married previously and had one child by the previous marriage. They had five children: Angela, Victoria, John Jr., Frank (d. 1980) and Peter. Gotti attempted to work legitimately in 1962 as a presser in a coat factory and as an assistant truck driver. However, he could not stay crime-free and, by 1966, had been jailed twice.

Gambino crime family

Associate 
As early as his teens, Gotti was running errands for Carmine Fatico, a capo in the Gambino family, then known as the Anastasia family under the leadership of boss Albert Anastasia. Gotti carried out truck hijackings at Idlewild Airport (subsequently renamed John F. Kennedy International Airport) together with his brother Gene and friend Ruggiero. During this time, Gotti befriended fellow mob hijacker and future Bonanno family boss Joseph Massino, and he was given the nicknames "Black John" and "Crazy Horse". It was around this time that Gotti met his mentor and Gambino underboss Aniello "Neil" Dellacroce.

In February 1968, United Airlines employees identified Gotti as the man who had signed for stolen merchandise; the FBI arrested him for that hijacking soon after. Gotti was arrested a third time for hijacking while out on bail two months later, this time for stealing a load of cigarettes worth $50,000 on the New Jersey Turnpike. Later that year, Gotti pleaded guilty to the Northwest Airlines hijacking and was sentenced to three years at Lewisburg Federal Penitentiary.

Gotti and Ruggiero were paroled in 1972 and returned to their old crew at the Bergin Hunt and Fish Club, still working under Fatico. Gotti was transferred to management of the Bergin crew's illegal gambling, where he proved himself to be an effective enforcer. Fatico was indicted on loansharking charges in 1972. As a condition of his release, he could not associate with known felons. Gotti was not yet a made man in the Mafia due to the membership books' having been closed since 1957 due to the Apalachin meeting, but Fatico named him acting capo of the Bergin crew soon after he was paroled. In this new role, Gotti frequently traveled to Dellacroce's headquarters at the Ravenite Social Club to brief the underboss on the crew's activities. Dellacroce had already taken a liking to Gotti, and the two became even closer during this time. The two were very similar—both had strong violent streaks, cursed a lot, and were heavy gamblers.

After Emanuel Gambino, nephew to boss Carlo Gambino, was kidnapped and murdered in 1973, Gotti was assigned to the hit team alongside Ruggiero and Ralph Galione to search for the main suspect, gangster James McBratney. The team botched their attempt to abduct McBratney at a Staten Island bar when they attempted to arrest him while posing as detectives, and Galione shot McBratney dead when his accomplices managed to restrain him. Gotti was identified by eyewitnesses and by a police insider, and was arrested for the killing in June 1974. He was able to strike a plea bargain, however, with the help of attorney Roy Cohn, and was sentenced to four years in prison for attempted manslaughter for his part in the hit.

After Gotti's death, he was also identified by Massino as the killer of Vito Borelli, a Gambino associate killed in 1975 for insulting then-acting boss Paul Castellano.

Remo Franceschini, a member of the NYPD from 1957 to 1991 who specialized in organized crime; when asked in 1993 why he knew at an early stage that Gotti would become a major figure in the Mafia, said: "He was charismatic and a leader. He wasn't a womanizer. He spent all his time with his men. He also had a very sharp mind and total recall. And he exuded toughness. There were few men who would go against him".

Captain 
On October 15, 1976, Carlo Gambino died at home of natural causes. Against expectations, he had appointed Castellano to succeed him over his underboss Dellacroce. Gambino appeared to believe that his crime family would benefit from Castellano's focus on white-collar businesses. Dellacroce, at the time, was imprisoned for tax evasion and was unable to contest Castellano's succession. Castellano's succession was confirmed at a meeting on November 24, with Dellacroce present. Castellano arranged for Dellacroce to remain as underboss while directly running traditional Cosa Nostra activities such as extortion, robbery, and loansharking. While Dellacroce accepted Castellano's succession, the deal effectively split the Gambino family into two rival factions.

In 1976, the membership books were reportedly reopened. Gotti was released in July 1977, after two years' imprisonment; he was subsequently initiated as a made man into the Gambino family, now under the command of Castellano, and immediately promoted to replace Fatico as capo of the Bergin crew. He and his crew reported directly to Dellacroce as part of the concessions given by Castellano to keep Dellacroce as underboss, and Gotti was regarded as Dellacroce's protégé. Under Gotti, the crew were Dellacroce's biggest earners. Besides his cut of his subordinates' earnings, Gotti ran his own loansharking operation and held a no-show job as a plumbing supply salesman. Unconfirmed allegations by FBI informants in the Bergin Hunt and Fish Club claimed that Gotti also financed drug deals.

Gotti tried to keep most of his personal family uninvolved with his life of crime, with the exception of his son John Angelo Gotti, who was a mob associate by 1982.

In December 1978, Gotti assisted in the largest unrecovered cash robbery in history, the infamous Lufthansa Heist at Kennedy Airport. Gotti had made arrangements for the getaway van to be crushed and baled at a scrapyard in Brooklyn. Gotti's cut of the heist was a reported $200,000. The driver of the van, Parnell "Stacks" Edwards, failed to follow orders; rather than driving the vehicle to the scrapyard, he parked it near a fire hydrant and went to sleep at his girlfriend's apartment. The NYPD recovered the van and lifted the fingerprints of several perpetrators of the robbery, helping to unravel the heist.

On March 18, 1980, Gotti's youngest son, 12-year-old Frank Gotti, was run over and killed on a family friend's minibike by a neighbor named John Favara. Frank's death was ruled an accident, but Favara subsequently received death threats and was attacked by Victoria with a baseball bat when he visited the Gottis to apologize. On July 28, 1980, Favara was abducted and disappeared, presumed murdered. Gotti is widely assumed to have ordered the murder despite him and his family leaving on vacation for Florida three days before the murder.

Gotti was indicted on two occasions in his last two years as the Bergin capo, with both cases coming to trial after his ascension to boss of the Gambinos. In September 1984, Gotti had an altercation with refrigerator mechanic Romual Piecyk, and was subsequently charged with assault and robbery. In 1985, he was indicted alongside Dellacroce and several Bergin crew members in a racketeering case by Assistant U.S. Attorney Diane Giacalone. The indictment revealed that Gotti's friend and codefendant Wilfred "Willie Boy" Johnson had been an FBI informant.

Taking over the Gambino family 
Gotti rapidly became dissatisfied with Castellano's leadership, regarding the new boss as being too isolated and greedy. Like other members of the family, Gotti also personally disliked Castellano. The boss lacked street credibility, and those who had paid their dues running street-level jobs did not respect him. Gotti also had an economic interest: he had a running dispute with Castellano on the split Gotti took from hijackings at Kennedy Airport. Gotti was also rumored to be expanding into drug dealing, a lucrative trade Castellano had banned.

In August 1983, Ruggiero and Gene Gotti were arrested for dealing heroin, based primarily on recordings from a bug in Ruggiero's house. Castellano, who had banned made men from his family from dealing drugs under threat of death, demanded transcripts of the tapes, and, when Ruggiero refused, he threatened to demote Gotti.

In 1984, Castellano was arrested and indicted in a RICO case for the crimes of Gambino hitman Roy DeMeo's crew. The following year, he received a second indictment for his role in the Mafia's Commission. Facing life imprisonment for either case, Castellano arranged for Gotti to serve as an acting boss alongside Thomas Bilotti, Castellano's favorite capo, and Thomas Gambino in his absence. Gotti, meanwhile, began conspiring with fellow disgruntled capos Frank DeCicco and Joseph "Joe Piney" Armone and soldiers Sammy Gravano and Robert "DiB" DiBernardo (collectively dubbed "the Fist" by themselves) to overthrow Castellano, insisting, despite the boss' inaction, that Castellano would eventually try to kill him. Armone's support was critical; as a respected old-timer who dated back to the family's founder, Vincent Mangano, he would lend needed credibility to the conspirators' cause.

It has long been a rule in the Mafia that a boss could only be killed with the approval of a majority of the Commission. Indeed, Gotti's planned hit would have been the first unsanctioned hit on a boss since Frank Costello was nearly killed in 1957. Gotti knew that it would be too risky to solicit support from the other four bosses, since they had longstanding ties to Castellano. To get around this, he got the support of several important figures of his generation in the Lucchese, Colombo and Bonanno families. He did not consider approaching the Genovese family; Castellano's ties with Genovese boss Vincent "Chin" Gigante were so close that any overture to a Genovese soldier would have been a tipoff. However, Gotti could also count on the complicity of Gambino consigliere Joseph N. Gallo.

After Dellacroce died of cancer on December 2, 1985, Castellano revised his succession plan: appointing Bilotti as underboss to Thomas Gambino as the sole acting boss, while making plans to break up Gotti's crew. Infuriated by this, and Castellano's refusal to attend Dellacroce's wake, Gotti resolved to kill his boss. When DeCicco tipped Gotti off that he would be having a meeting with Castellano and several other Gambino mobsters at Sparks Steak House on December 16, 1985, Gotti chose to take the opportunity. Both the boss and underboss were ambushed and shot dead by assassins under Gotti's command when they arrived at the meeting in the evening. Gotti watched the hit from his car with Gravano.

Several days after the murder, Gotti was named to a three-man committee to temporarily run the family pending the election of a new boss, along with Gallo and DeCicco. It was also announced that an internal investigation into Castellano's murder was underway. However, it was an open secret that Gotti was acting boss in all but name, and nearly all of the family's capos knew he had been the one behind the hit. He was formally acclaimed as the new boss of the Gambino family at a meeting of 20 capos held on January 15, 1986. He appointed DeCicco as the new underboss while retaining Gallo as consigliere.

Crime boss 
Identified as both Castellano's likely murderer and his successor, Gotti rose to fame throughout 1986. At the time of his takeover, the Gambino family was regarded as the most powerful American Mafia family, with an annual income of $500 million. In the book Underboss, Gravano estimated that Gotti himself had an annual income of no less than $5 million during his years as boss, and more likely between $10 million and $12 million. To protect himself legally, Gotti banned members of the Gambino family from accepting plea bargains that acknowledged the existence of the organization.

"The Teflon Don" 
Gotti often smiled and waved at television cameras at his trials, which gained him favor with some of the general public. Gotti's newfound fame had at least one positive effect; upon the revelation of his attacker's occupation, and amid reports of intimidation by the Gambinos, Romual Piecyk decided not to testify against Gotti thanks to Boško "The Yugo" Radonjić, the head of the Westies in Hell's Kitchen, Manhattan. When the trial began in March 1986, Piecyk testified he was unable to remember who attacked him. The case was promptly dismissed, with the New York Post summarizing the proceedings with the headline "I Forgotti!" It was later revealed that Gambino thugs had severed Piecyk's brake lines, made threatening phone calls and stalked him before the trial.

On April 13, 1986, DeCicco was killed when his car was bombed following a visit to Castellano loyalist James Failla. The bombing was carried out by Victor Amuso and Anthony Casso of the Lucchese family, under orders of Gigante and Lucchese boss Anthony Corallo, to avenge Castellano and Bilotti by killing their successors; Gotti also planned to visit Failla that day, but canceled, and the bomb was detonated after a soldier who rode with DeCicco was mistaken for the boss. Bombs had long been banned by the Mafia out of concern that it would put innocent people in harm's way, leading the Gambinos to initially suspect that "zips"—Sicilian mafiosi working in the U.S.—were behind it; zips were well known for using bombs.

Following the bombing, Judge Eugene Nickerson, presiding over Gotti's racketeering trial, rescheduled to avoid a jury tainted by the resulting publicity, while Giacalone had Gotti's bail revoked due to evidence of witness intimidation in the Piecyk case. From jail, Gotti ordered the murder of Robert DiBernardo by Gravano; both DiBernardo and Ruggiero had been vying to succeed DeCicco until Ruggiero accused DiBernardo of challenging Gotti's leadership. When Ruggiero, also under indictment, had his bail revoked for his abrasive behavior in preliminary hearings, a frustrated Gotti instead promoted Armone to underboss.

Jury selection for the racketeering case began again in August 1986, with Gotti standing trial alongside his ex-companion William "Willie Boy" Johnson (who, despite being exposed as an informant, refused to turn state's evidence), Leonard DiMaria, Tony Rampino, Nicholas Corozzo and John Carneglia. At this point, the Gambinos were able to compromise the case when George Pape hid his friendship with Radonjić and was empaneled as juror No. 11. Through Radonjić, Pape contacted Gravano and agreed to sell his vote on the jury for $60,000.

In the trial's opening statements on September 25, Gotti's defense attorney Bruce Cutler denied the existence of the Gambino family and framed the government's entire effort as a personal vendetta. His main defense strategy during the prosecution was to attack the credibility of prosecutor Diane Giacalone's witnesses by discussing their crimes committed before their turning state's evidence. During Gotti's defense, Cutler called bank robber Matthew Traynor, a would-be prosecution witness dropped for unreliability, who testified that Giacalone offered him drugs and her underwear as a masturbation aid in exchange for his testimony; Traynor's allegations would be dismissed by Judge Nickerson as "wholly unbelievable" after the trial, and he was subsequently convicted of perjury.

Despite Cutler's defense and critiques about the prosecution's performance, according to mob writers Jerry Capeci and Gene Mustain, when the jury's deliberations began, a majority were in favor of convicting Gotti. However, due to Pape's misconduct, Gotti knew from the beginning of the trial that he could do no worse than a hung jury. During deliberations, Pape held out for acquittal until the rest of the jury began to fear their own safety would be compromised. On March 13, 1987, they acquitted Gotti and his codefendants of all charges including loansharking, illegal gambling, murder and armed hijackings. Five years later, Pape was convicted of obstruction of justice for his part in the fix and sentenced to three years in prison.

In the face of previous Mafia convictions, particularly the success of the Mafia Commission Trial, Gotti's acquittal was a major upset that further added to his reputation. The American media dubbed Gotti "The Teflon Don" in reference to the failure of any charges to "stick".

Reorganization 

While Gotti himself had escaped conviction, his associates were not as fortunate. The other two men in the Gambino administration, underboss Armone and consigliere Gallo, had been indicted on racketeering charges in 1986 and were both convicted in December 1987. The heroin trial of Gotti's former fellow Bergin crewmembers Ruggiero and Gene Gotti also commenced in June of that year.

Prior to their convictions, Gotti allowed Gallo to retire and promoted Gravano in his place while slating Frank Locascio to serve as acting underboss in the event of Armone's imprisonment. The Gambinos also worked to compromise the heroin trial's jury, resulting in two mistrials. When the terminally ill Ruggiero was severed and released in 1989, Gotti refused to contact him, blaming him for the Gambinos' misfortunes. According to Gravano, Gotti also considered murdering Ruggiero and when he finally died, "I literally had to drag him to the funeral."

Beginning in January 1988, Gotti, against Gravano's advice, required his capos to meet with him at the Ravenite Social Club once a week. Regarded by Gene as an unnecessary vanity-inspired risk, and by FBI Gambino squad leader Bruce Mouw as antithetical to the "secret society", this move allowed FBI surveillance to record and identify much of the Gambino hierarchy. It also provided strong circumstantial evidence that Gotti was a boss; long-standing protocol in the Mafia requires public demonstrations of loyalty to the boss. The FBI also bugged the Ravenite, but failed to produce any high-quality incriminating recordings.

Later in 1988, Gotti, Gigante and new Lucchese boss Victor Amuso attended the first Commission meeting at the LaBar Bat Club in Manhattan since the Commission trial. In 1986, future Lucchese underboss Anthony Casso had been injured in an unauthorized hit by Gambino capo Mickey Paradiso. The following year, the FBI warned Gotti they had recorded Genovese consigliere Louis Manna discussing another hit on Gotti and his brother. In order to avoid a war, the leaders of the three families met, denied knowledge of their violence against one another, and agreed to "communicate better". The bosses also agreed to allow Colombo acting boss Victor Orena to join the Commission, but Gigante, wary of giving Gotti a majority by admitting another ally, blocked the reentry of Massino and the Bonannos.

Gotti was also able to influence the New Jersey-based DeCavalcante crime family in 1988. According to the DeCavalcante capo-turned-informant Anthony Rotondo, Gotti attended his father's wake with numerous other Gambino mobsters in a "show of force" and forced boss John Riggi to agree to run his family on the Gambinos' behalf. The DeCavalcantes remained in the Gambinos' sphere of influence until Gotti's imprisonment.

Gotti's son, John Gotti Jr., was initiated into the Gambino family on Christmas Eve 1988. According to fellow mobster Michael DiLeonardo, initiated on the same night, Gravano held the ceremony to keep Gotti from being accused of nepotism. John Jr. was promptly promoted to capo.

Assault acquittal 
On the evening of January 23, 1989, Gotti was arrested outside the Ravenite and charged with ordering the 1986 assault of labor union official John O'Connor. In the back of the police car, Gotti remarked, "Three to one I beat this charge". O'Connor, a leader in the United Brotherhood of Carpenters and Joiners of America Local 608 who was later convicted of racketeering himself, was believed to have ordered an attack on a Gambino-associated restaurant that had snubbed the union and was subsequently shot and wounded by the Westies. After one night in prison, Gotti was released on $100,000 bail. Gotti had his occupation listed as a salesman for a plumbing contracting company.

By this time, the FBI had cultivated new informants and learned part of the reason the Ravenite bug failed was that Gotti would hold sensitive conversations in a rear hallway in the building the club occupied or in an apartment in its upper floors where a friendly widow of a Gambino soldier lived, and by November 1989, both locations were bugged. The apartment bug was particularly fruitful due to Gotti's frankness as he discussed his position as family boss in meetings there. In a December 12 conversation with Frank Locascio, Gotti plainly acknowledged ordering the murders of DiBernardo and Liborio Milito — the latter being one of Gravano's partners killed for insubordination. He also announced his intention to kill soldier Louis DiBono, who had ignored a summons to meet with Gotti to discuss his mismanagement of a drywall business he held with Gotti and Gravano. The FBI, however, misheard the namedrop and failed to warn DiBono, who was killed on October 4, 1990. In another taped meeting on January 4, 1990, Gotti promoted Gravano to underboss, preferring Gravano to lead the family if he was convicted in the assault case.

State prosecutors linked Gotti to the case with a recording of him discussing O'Connor and announcing his intention to "bust him up," and the testimony of Westies gangster James McElroy, however Gotti was acquitted of all six assault and conspiracy charges at trial on February 9, 1990. After the trial, there were firework displays by locals. Jules J. Bonavolonta, director of the FBI's organized-crime division in New York stated, "With all this media coverage he's beginning to look like a folk hero... What the public should realize is that he is the boss of the largest Cosa Nostra family, that he surrounds himself with ruthless killers and that he is flat out a criminal." It later emerged, however, that FBI bugs had apparently caught Gotti discussing plans to fix the jury as he had in the 1986–87 racketeering case. However, to the outrage of Manhattan district attorney Robert Morgenthau and state-organized crime taskforce chief Ronald Goldstock, the FBI and federal prosecutors chose not to reveal this information to them. Morgenthau later said that had he known about these bugged conversations, he would have asked for a mistrial.

1992 conviction 

Gotti, Gravano and Locascio, were often recorded by the bugs placed throughout the Ravenite (concealed in the main room, the first-floor hallway and the upstairs apartment of the building) discussing incriminating events. On December 11, 1990, FBI agents and NYPD detectives raided the Ravenite, arresting Gotti, Gravano and Frank Locascio. Federal prosecutors charged Gotti, in this new racketeering case, with five murders (Castellano, Bilotti, DiBernardo, Liborio Milito and, after review of the apartment tapes, Louis Dibono), conspiracy to murder Gaetano "Corky" Vastola, loansharking, illegal gambling, obstruction of justice, bribery and tax evasion. Based on tapes from FBI bugs played at pretrial hearings, the Gambino administration was denied bail. At the same time, attorneys Cutler and Gerald Shargel were disqualified from defending Gotti and Gravano after prosecutors successfully contended they were "part of the evidence" and thus liable to be called as witnesses. Prosecutors argued that Cutler and Shargel not only knew about potential criminal activity, but had worked as "in-house counsel" for the Gambino family. Gotti subsequently hired Albert Krieger, a Miami attorney who had worked with Joseph Bonanno, to replace Cutler.

The tapes also created a rift between Gotti and Gravano, where the Gambino boss described his newly appointed underboss as too greedy and attempted to frame Gravano as the main force behind the murders of DiBernardo, Milito and Dibono. Gotti's attempt at reconciliation failed, leaving Gravano disillusioned with the mob and doubtful on his chances of winning his case without Shargel, his former attorney. Gravano ultimately opted to turn state's evidence, formally agreeing to testify on November 13, 1991. He was the highest-ranking member of a New York crime family to turn informer, until Joseph Massino in 2003.

Gotti and Locascio were tried in the U.S. District Court for the Eastern District of New York before District Judge I. Leo Glasser. Jury selection began in January 1992 with an anonymous jury and, for the first time in a Brooklyn federal case, fully sequestered during the trial due to Gotti's reputation for jury tampering. The trial commenced with the prosecution's opening statements on February 12; prosecutors Andrew Maloney and John Gleeson began their case by playing tapes showing Gotti discussing Gambino family business, including murders he approved, and confirming the animosity between Gotti and Castellano to establish the former's motive to kill his boss. After calling an eyewitness of the Sparks hit who identified Carneglia as one of the men who shot Bilotti, they then brought Gravano to testify on March 2.

On the stand, Gravano confirmed Gotti's place in the structure of the Gambino family and described in detail the conspiracy to assassinate Castellano, giving a full description of the hit and its aftermath. Gravano confessed to 19 murders, implicating Gotti in four of them. Krieger, and Locascio's attorney, Anthony Cardinale, proved unable to shake Gravano during cross-examination. After additional testimony and tapes, the government rested its case on March 24.

Five of Krieger and Cardinale's intended six witnesses were ruled irrelevant or extraneous, leaving only Gotti's tax attorney Murray Appleman to testify on his behalf. The defense also attempted unsuccessfully to have a mistrial declared based on Maloney's closing remarks. Gotti himself became increasingly hostile during the trial, and at one point, Glasser threatened to remove him from the courtroom. Among other outbursts, Gotti called Gravano a junkie while his attorneys sought to discuss his past steroid use, and equated the dismissal of a juror to the fixing of the 1919 World Series.

On April 2, 1992, after only 14 hours of deliberation, the jury found Gotti guilty on all charges of the indictment (Locascio was found guilty on all but one). James Fox, Assistant Director in Charge or "ADIC" of the FBI's New York Field Office, announced at a press conference, "The Teflon is gone. The don is covered with Velcro, and all the charges stuck." On June 23, 1992, Glasser sentenced both defendants to life imprisonment without the possibility of parole and a $250,000 fine.

Incarceration and death 

Gotti was incarcerated at the United States Penitentiary at Marion, Illinois. He spent the majority of his sentence in effective solitary confinement, allowed out of his cell for only one hour a day. His final appeal was rejected by the U.S. Supreme Court in 1994.

On July 18, 1996, a fellow inmate named Walter Johnson punched Gotti in the prison recreation room, leaving him bruised and bleeding, because according to New York's Daily News, Gotti had disrespected him with a racial slur. Gotti, desiring revenge, offered Aryan Brotherhood chieftains David Sahakian and Michael McElhiney somewhere between US$40,000 and $400,000 to have Johnson killed. In August, McElhiney told two Brotherhood underlings to kill Johnson "if given the opportunity," according to a federal indictment charging him and 39 other gang members with murder, attempted murder and racketeering. Johnson, however, was transferred to the Supermax prison in Florence, Colorado.

Despite his imprisonment and pressure from the Commission to stand down, Gotti asserted his prerogative to retain his title as boss until his death or retirement, with his brother Peter and his son John Jr. relaying orders on his behalf. By 1998, when he was indicted on racketeering, John Jr. was believed to be the acting boss of the family. Against his father's wishes, John Jr. pleaded guilty and was sentenced to six years and five months' imprisonment in 1999. He maintains he has since left the Gambino family. Peter Gotti subsequently became acting boss and is believed to have formally succeeded his brother shortly before Gotti's death.

John Jr.'s indictment brought further stress to Gotti's marriage. Victoria DiGiorgio Gotti, up to that point unaware of her son's involvement in the Mafia, blamed her husband for ruining her son's life and threatened to leave him unless he allowed John Jr. to leave the mob.

In 1998, Gotti was diagnosed with throat cancer and sent to the United States Medical Center for Federal Prisoners in Springfield, Missouri, for surgery. Though the tumor was removed, the cancer was discovered to have returned two years later and Gotti was transferred back to Springfield, where he spent the rest of his life.

Gotti's condition rapidly declined and he died on June 10, 2002, at the age of 61. The Catholic Diocese of Brooklyn announced that Gotti's family would not be permitted to have a Requiem Mass, but allowed a memorial Mass after the burial.

Gotti's funeral was held in a non-church facility. After the funeral, an estimated 300 onlookers followed the procession, which passed Gotti's Bergin Hunt and Fish Club, to the gravesite. Gotti's body was interred in a crypt next to his son, Frank. Gotti's brother, Peter, was unable to attend because of his incarceration. In an apparent repudiation of Gotti's leadership and legacy, the other New York City families sent no representatives to the funeral. Numerous prosecutions triggered by Gotti's tactics left the Gambinos decimated. By the turn of the century, half of the family's made men were in prison.

In popular culture 
Since his conviction, Gotti has been portrayed in six TV movies, two documentary series, three theatrical films and been subject in music.

Film and TV 
 Getting Gotti – 1994 CBS TV movie, portrayed by Anthony John Denison
 Gotti – 1996 HBO TV movie, portrayed by Armand Assante
 Witness to the Mob – 1998 NBC miniseries, portrayed by Tom Sizemore
 A 1999 episode of the documentary series The FBI Files narrated the story of the investigation and conviction of Gotti.
The Big Heist – 2001 Canadian-American TV movie which aired on A&E, portrayed by Steven Randazzo
 Boss of Bosses – 2001 TNT TV movie adapted from the book of the same name, portrayed by Sonny Marinelli
 Sinatra Club – 2010 theatrical film, portrayed by Danny Nucci
 The Wannabe – 2015 film, portrayed by Joseph Siravo
 The documentary series Mugshots aired an episode, "John Gotti: End of the Sicilians", in 2017. Filmed in Sicily and Brooklyn, the episode featured court wiretaps and undercover footage of Gotti's mob.
 Gotti – 2018 theatrical film, portrayed by John Travolta
 Victoria Gotti: My Father's Daughter is a 2019 television movie based on the book by Victoria Gotti. John Gotti is played by Maurice Bernard.

Music 
 Gotti is the key subject of the song "King of New York", by New York rap-rock group Fun Lovin' Criminals, released in 1996. The song reached number 28 in the UK singles chart and featured on the band's debut album Come Find Yourself, which achieved platinum status in the UK.
 In the 1996 song "D'Evils", Jay-Z states "I never prayed to God, I prayed to Gotti" to discuss his aspirations toward criminal success. Lupe Fiasco later referenced the lyric in his 2006 song "Hurt Me Soul".
 Gotti is mentioned in the song "Everybody Get Up", by British boy band Five, released in 1998.
 "Who Da Neighbors" is a 2011 song by Juicy J and Lex Luger, in which Juicy J compares his rise from the projects and his development of expensive tastes to that of John Gotti.
 The 2013 song "Versace (Remix)", by Migos and Drake, references John Gotti as a notorious drug dealer.

Notes

References

Sources 
 Blum, Howard. Gangland : How The FBI Broke the Mob. New York: Simon & Schuster, 1993. 
 Capeci, Jerry and Gene Mustain. Mob Star: The Story of John Gotti. New York: Penguin, 1988. 
 Capeci, Jerry and Gene Mustain. Gotti: Rise and Fall. New York: Onyx, 1996. 
 Davis, John H. Mafia Dynasty: The Rise and Fall of the Gambino Crime Family. New York: HarperCollins, 1993. 
 Maas, Peter. Underboss: Sammy the Bull Gravano's Story of Life in the Mafia. New York, N.Y.: HarperPaperbacks, 1997. .
 Raab, Selwyn. Five Families: The Rise, Decline, and Resurgence of America's Most Powerful Mafia Empires. London: Robson Books, 2006.

External links 

 John Gotti – Biography.com
 John Gotti: How We Made the Charges Stick – Federal Bureau of Investigation
 
 

1940 births
2002 deaths
20th-century American criminals
American crime bosses
American gangsters of Italian descent
American murderers
American people convicted of murder
American people convicted of tax crimes
American people who died in prison custody
Bosses of the Gambino crime family
Burials at St. John's Cemetery (Queens)
Capo dei capi
Catholics from New York (state)
Criminals from Queens, New York
Deaths from cancer in Missouri
Deaths from throat cancer
Gambino crime family
Gangsters from New York City
Gangsters sentenced to life imprisonment
Gotti family
Male murderers]
People acquitted of assault
People acquitted of racketeering
People convicted of obstruction of justice
People convicted of racketeering
People from East New York, Brooklyn
People from Howard Beach, Queens
People from Ozone Park, Queens
People of Campanian descent
People convicted of murder by the United States federal government
Prisoners sentenced to life imprisonment by the United States federal government
Prisoners who died in United States federal government detention